God Save The Clean is a New Zealand tribute compilation album featuring artist who are under the record label Flying Nun Records amongst others performing songs by New Zealand rock band The Clean.  The album was released in 1997.

Track listing
"Beatnik" - Head Like a Hole
"Sad Eyed Lady" - Alec Bathgate
"What Ever I Do is Right/Wrong" - Barbara Manning & Calexico
"Side On" - Salmonella Dub
"Fish" - Gray Bartlett
"Oddity" - Pavement
"Franz Kafka At the Zoo (Metamorphosis Mix)" - Rotor
"Attack of the Teddy Bears" - Nodrog
"Yesterday Was" - Chris Knox
"Draw(in) to a (w)hole" - Guided by Voices
"On Again, Off Again" - Livids
"Small Girl" - Cloudboy
"End of my Dream" - Conray
"At the Bottom (Mach 2)" - ICU
"Point That Thing Somewhere Else" - HDU & Peter Gutteridge
"Anything Could Happen" - Baiter Cell
"Billy Two" - Bressa Creeting Cake
"Two Fat Sisters" - Graeme Downes
"Platypus" - Scooter
"Getting Older" - Alastair Galbraith
"Do Your Thing" - Sugarbug

References

Compilation albums by New Zealand artists
Tribute albums
Dunedin Sound albums
1997 compilation albums
Flying Nun Records compilation albums